The Santa Maria Magdalena Parish Church (also Saint Mary Magdalene Parish Church) is a Roman Catholic church in Magdalena, Laguna, Philippines under the Roman Catholic Diocese of San Pablo.

History
Magdalena was formerly known as Ambling, a barrio of Majayjay until it was elevated as a town in 1821. The first church, made of cogon and wood was constructed in 1820 and was dedicated to Mary Magdalene. Father Antonio Moreno, OFM was appointed at its first parish priest in 1821. A permission to build a stone church was ordered by Captain Pablo de la Concepción in 1829.  To obtain funds for the church, the people were forced to pay taxes and quarry sand and stones from the river. The construction of the church building was halted in 1839, continued in 1849 and finished in 1855 under the direction of Father Maximo Rico, Father Jose Cuesta, Father Joaquin de Coria and Father Francisco de Paula Gonzalez. Construction of the belltower was finished in 1861.

In its convent, Filipino revolutionary leader General Emilio Jacinto sought refuge and his blood stains could be found.

Architecture
The Baroque church is elevated by a flight of steps facing a plaza. It is mainly made out of sandstone. To its left is a four story octagonal belltower with a square base.

Notes

Bibliography

External links 

 Saint Mary Magdalene Parish (Official Facebook page)

Roman Catholic churches in Laguna (province)
Spanish Colonial architecture in the Philippines
Churches in the Roman Catholic Diocese of San Pablo